Adam Nodelman (1966 – 2008) was an American bassist. A native of Nyack, NY, he was known for his contributions to the jazz trio Borbetomagus, hardcore punk band, Borscht, and also worked with Motherhead Bug, Crash Worship, Missing Foundation, Sunburned Hand of the Man and Sulfur. He died in 2008 at the age of forty-three.

Discography
Borbetomagus
Live in Allentown (1985)
Fish That Sparkling Bubble (1988)
Seven Reasons for Tears (1989)

Missing Foundation
Missing Foundation (1987)

Guest appearances
 Motherhead Bug: Zambodia (1993)

References

External links

1966 births
2008 deaths
American punk rock bass guitarists
American industrial musicians
Free jazz musicians
American post-punk musicians
Guitarists from New York City
American male bass guitarists
20th-century American bass guitarists
20th-century American male musicians
American male jazz musicians